Tucetona is a genus of saltwater clams, marine bivalve molluscs in the family Glycymerididae, the bittersweet clams. Unlike other genera in the family, Tucetona species have a ribbed shell.

Species
Species within the genus Tucetona include:
 Tucetona amboinensis (Gmelin, 1791) 
 Tucetona angusticosta Lamprell & Whitehead, 1990 
 Tucetona arcodentiens (Dall, 1895) 
 Tucetona audouini (Jousseaume in Lamy, 1916) 
 Tucetona aureomaculata (Angas, 1879) 
 Tucetona auriflua (Reeve, 1843) 
 Tucetona bicolor (Reeve, 1843) 
 Tucetona broadfooti (Iredale, 1929)
 Tucetona isabellae Valentich-Scott & Garfinkle, 2011
 Tucetona kauaia (Dall, Bartsch & Rehder, 1938) 
 Tucetona kilburni Matsukuma, 1984 
 Tucetona laticostata (Quoy & Gaimard, 1835) 
 Tucetona mindoroensis (E. A. Smith, 1916) 
 Tucetona molokaia (Dall, Bartsch & Rehder, 1938) 
 Tucetona montrouzieri (Angas, 1872) 
 Tucetona multicostata (G.B. Sowerby I, 1833) 
 Tucetona nodosa (Reeve, 1843) 
 Tucetona nux (Dall, Bartsch & Rehder, 1938) 
 Tucetona oculata (Reeve, 1843) 
 Tucetona odhneri Iredale, 1939 
 Tucetona pallium (Reeve, 1843) 
 Tucetona pectinata (Gmelin, 1791) 
 Tucetona pectunculus (Linnaeus, 1758) 
 Tucetona planata (G. Nevill & H. L. Nevill, 1874) 
 Tucetona prashadi (Nicol, 1951) 
 Tucetona saggiecoheni Poppe, Tagaro & Stahlschmidt, 2015
 Tucetona scalarisculpta Lamprell & Whitehead, 1990
 Tucetona sericata (Reeve, 1843) 
 Tucetona shinkurosensis Hatai, Niino & Kotaka in Niino, 1952 
 Tucetona sibogae Matsukuma, 1982 
 Tucetona sordida (Tate, 1891) 
 Tucetona strigilata (G.B. Sowerby I, 1833) 
 Tucetona subpectiniformis (Nomura & Zinbo, 1934) 
 Tucetona subtilis Nicol, 1956 
 Tucetona tegulicia (Melvill, 1898) 
 Tucetona tsugioi Matsukuma, 1984

References

Catalogue of Life
WoRMS

Glycymerididae
Bivalve genera